The People Could Fly: American Black Folktales is a 1985 collection of twenty-four folktales retold by Virginia Hamilton and illustrated by Leo and Diane Dillon. They encompass animal tales (including tricksters), fairy tales, supernatural tales, and tales of the enslaved Africans (including slave narratives).

Publication history
1985, Knopf, hardback
1987, Knopf, audiobook on CD, 12 tales read by James Earl Jones, 1 disc and book
2005, Audio Bookshelf, audiobook on CD, read by Andrew L. Barnes, 4 discs and book

Reception
A review by the School Library Journal, stated: "The well-known author here retells 24 black American folk tales in sure storytelling voice. ... All are beautifully readable." and concluded "With the added attraction of 40 bordered full- and half-page illustrations by the Dillons wonderfully expressive paintings reproduced in black and white this collection should be snapped up."

The New York Times review by Ishmael Reed called The People Could Fly "extraordinary and wonderful", commended Hamilton for writing "these tales in the Black English of the slave storytellers" and found it "Handsomely illustrated".

The People Could Fly has also been reviewed by Publishers Weekly, Booklist, Common Sense Media,

It has been used in study.

The book inspired the title of the 2021 Metropolitan Museum of Art exhibition, Before Yesterday We Could Fly.

Awards
The People Could Fly has received a number of awards including:
 1985 Horn Book Fanfare Book
 1985 New York Times Best Illustrated Children's Books book
 1986 Coretta Scott King Award author winner
 1986 Coretta Scott King Award illustrator honor
 1988 William Allen White Children's Book Award nominee

References

1985 children's books
American children's books
1985 short story collections
Children's short story collections
American short story collections
Collections of fairy tales
American folklore
Fables
Gullah culture
Gullah history
Slave narratives
Fictional slaves
Books illustrated by Leo and Diane Dillon
Literature by African-American women
Coretta Scott King Award-winning works